Erythorbic acid (isoascorbic acid, D-araboascorbic acid) is a stereoisomer of ascorbic acid (vitamin C). It is synthesized by a reaction between methyl 2-keto-D-gluconate and sodium methoxide. It can also be synthesized from sucrose or by strains of Penicillium that have been selected for this feature. It is denoted by E number E315, and is widely used as an antioxidant in processed foods.

Clinical trials have been conducted to investigate aspects of the nutritional value of erythorbic acid. One such trial investigated the effects of erythorbic acid on vitamin C metabolism in young women; no effect on vitamin C uptake or clearance from the body was found. A later study found that erythorbic acid is a potent enhancer of nonheme-iron absorption.

Since the U.S. Food and Drug Administration banned the use of sulfites as a preservative in foods intended to be eaten fresh (such as salad bar ingredients), the use of erythorbic acid as a food preservative has increased.

It is also used as a preservative in cured meats and frozen vegetables.

It was first synthesized in 1933 by the German chemists Kurt Maurer and Bruno Schiedt.

References

Food antioxidants
E-number additives
Substances discovered in the 1930s